Sherabad is a town of Bhawan tehsil in Punjab, Pakistan. It is located at Jhang-Chiniot road 14-km away from Bhawana city towards Jhang.

The name is of Persian origin, which is also shared with Urdu, standing for ''lion's lair'' ("sher/shir" for lion, and "abad" for English term, abode).

References 

Chiniot District
Populated places in Chiniot District